Practice or practise may refer to:

Education and learning
 Practice (learning method), a method of learning by repetition
 Phantom practice, phenomenon in which a person's abilities continue to improve, even without practicing
 Practice-based professional learning

Medical and pharmacy

 Medical practice, providing healthcare

Law
 Legal practice
 Practice of law

Art, media, and entertainment
 Practice chanter, a musical instrument used to practice the Great Highland bagpipes
 The Practice, a television series about a legal practice

Other
 Best practice
 Practice theory, a family of theories in sociology
 Spiritual practice
 Standards and Practices, a conventional, traditional, or otherwise standardised method

See also
 The Practice (disambiguation)
 Praxis (disambiguation)